Guogongzhuang is an interchange station on Line 9 and Fangshan Line of the Beijing Subway, serving as the southern terminus of Line 9, and is located in Fengtai District. The station was the northern terminus of Fangshan Line until it was extended northward to Dongguantou South on December 31, 2020.

Station Layout 
The station has underground dual-island platforms with a cross platform interchange. On one side terminating Line 9 trains interchange with Fangshan line trains heading to Yancundong (Yancun East), whilst on the other, Fangshan line trains heading to Dongguantounan (Dongguantou South) interchange with Line 9 and Fangshan line (through service) trains heading to Guojia Tushuguan (National Library).

Platform layout

Exits 
There are 4 exits, lettered A, B, C, and D. Exit D is accessible.

References

External links

Beijing Subway stations in Fengtai District
Railway stations in China opened in 2011